For Hire is an Urdu language book written by Asif Hussain Shah, a Pakistani taxi driver, and published in 2010. The book is based on the author's daily experiences and thoughts of his passengers while traveling in the city. The writer points out issues and problems in the Pakistani society and describes how to cope with them. The book was published by Ferozsons, consists of 120 pages and has 35 stories about the different experiences of the author.

About author 
Asif Hussain Shah is a Pakistani cabbie from Rawalpindi Cantonment and drives the cab in Islamabad and Rawalpindi.

He has garnered attention by advertising his book via his Taxi, by printing "Search on Google, Asif Hussain Shah" on the side of the taxi.

References 

Pakistani books
2010 non-fiction books
Pakistani non-fiction books
Urdu-language non-fiction literature
Ferozsons books